Loekman Hakim, stage name Loekman Noah (born December 30, 1975), is a guitar player for the popular Indonesian musical group Noah.

Career
Loekman joined Peterpan in 2000. At that time, the band had three members: Ariel, Uki, and Reza. Together with Peterpan, Loekman released six albums: Taman Langit, Bintang di Surga, Ost. Alexandria, Hari Yang Cerah, Sebuah Nama Sebuah Cerita and an instrumental album, Suara Lainnya. Peterpan was renamed Noah in August 2012 and continues to release new albums.

During his career as guitarist in this band, Loekman has earning a nomination for Most Famous Guitarist Player in 2013 SCTV Music Awards.

Personal life

Loekman Hakim was born in Cianjur, West Java, Indonesia, on December 30, 1975, to Eman Sulaeman and Iis Martini. Loekman is the third child of five siblings. His father was a teacher at SMP 5 Bandung. Loekman married Rika Nurhayati and they have two children.

Filmography

Film

Book
 Kisah Lainnya (2012)
 6.903 mil – Cerita di Balik Konser 2 Benua 5 Negara (2013)

Awards and nominations

References

External links
 
 
Profil Loekman Noah
Kisah Lainnya, Buku Perjalanan Band Ariel, Uki, Reza, Lukman, David
Gara-gara Film,Lukman Noah Kurangi Rokok
  Profil Loekman Noah di situs Kapanlagi

1975 births
Indonesian musicians
People from Bandung
Sundanese people
Living people
Noah (band) members